Asura doa is a moth of the family Erebidae. It was described by Lars Kühne in 2007. It is found in South Africa and Tanzania.

References

Moths described in 2007
doa
Insects of Tanzania
Moths of Africa